The Supreme Leader of Iran, also referred to as Supreme Leader of the Islamic Revolution, but officially called the Supreme Leadership Authority, is the head of state and the highest political and religious authority of the Islamic Republic of Iran (above the president). The armed forces, judiciary, state television, and other key government organisations such as Guardian Council and Expediency Discernment Council are subject to the Supreme Leader. According to  the constitution, the Supreme Leader delineates the general policies of the Islamic Republic (article 110), supervising the legislature, the judiciary, and the executive branches (article 57). The current lifetime officeholder, Ali Khamenei, has issued decrees and made the final decisions on the economy, the environment, foreign policy, education, national planning, and other aspects of governance in Iran. Khamenei also makes the final decisions on the amount of transparency in elections, and has dismissed and reinstated presidential cabinet appointees.  The Supreme Leader is legally considered "inviolable", with Iranians being routinely punished for questioning or insulting him.

The office was established by the Constitution of Iran in 1979, pursuant to Ayatollah Ruhollah Khomeini's concept of the Guardianship of the Islamic Jurist, and is a lifetime appointment. Originally the constitution required the Supreme Leader to be Marja'-e taqlid, the highest-ranking cleric in the religious laws of Usuli Twelver Shia Islam. In 1989, however, the constitution was amended and simply asked for Islamic "scholarship" to allow the Supreme Leader to be a lower-ranking cleric. As the Guardian Jurist (Vali-ye faqih), the Supreme Leader, guides the country, protecting it from heresy and imperialist predations, and ensuring the laws of Islam are followed.  The style "Supreme Leader" is commonly used as a sign of respect although the Constitution designates them simply as "Leader".  According to the constitution (Article 111), the Assembly of Experts is tasked with electing (following Ayatollah Khomeini), supervising, and dismissing  the Supreme Leader. In practice, the Assembly has never been known to challenge or otherwise publicly oversee any of the Supreme Leader's decisions (all of its meetings and notes are strictly confidential).  Members of the Assembly are chosen by bodies (the Guardian Council) whose members are appointed by the Supreme Leader or appointed by an individual (Chief Justice of Iran) appointed by the Supreme Leader.

In its history, the Islamic Republic of Iran only has had two Supreme Leaders: Khomeini, who held the position from 1979 until his death in 1989 and Ali Khamenei, who has held the position for 30+ years since Khomeini's death.

Mandate and status
The Supreme Leader of Iran is elected by the Assembly of Experts, which is also the only government body in charge of choosing and dismissing Supreme Leaders of Iran.

The Supreme Leader is the commander-in-chief of the armed forces and the  head of the three branches of the state (the Judiciary, the Legislature, and the Executive).

He oversees, appoints (or inaugurates) and can dismiss the following offices:
 Inaugurates the President and may also together with a two-thirds majority of the Parliament impeach him.
 The Chief Justice of Iran (Head of the Judiciary Branch usually a member of the Assembly of Experts) for a term of 8 years,
 the members of the Expediency Discernment Council for a term of 5 years.
 the members of Supreme Council of the Cultural Revolution.
 6 of the 12 members of the Guardian Council from among the members of the Assembly of Experts, the other 6 are chosen by the Parliament out of Islamic jurist candidates nominated by the Chief Justice of Iran who is in turn appointed by the Supreme Leader.
ministers of defense, intelligence, foreign affairs, interior and science.
two personal representatives to the Supreme National Security Council.
 Can delegate representatives to all branches of government. Ali Khamenei has currently around 2000 representatives.
 the head of the National Radio and Television Institution IRIB for a term of 8 years
 the head of the Foundation of Martyrs and Veterans Affairs
 the Imams of the Friday Prayer of each Province Capital (with the advice of all the Marja') for a lifetime
 Armed Forces of the Islamic Republic of Iran
 the Commander of the Armed Forces of the Islamic Republic of Iran
 the Commander of the Islamic Republic of Iran Army
 the Commander of the Islamic Republic of Iran Navy
 the Commander of the Islamic Republic of Iran Air Force
 the Commander of the Islamic Republic of Iran Air Defense Force
 Islamic Revolutionary Guard Corps (IRGC)
 the Commander of the IRGC
 the Commander of the IRGC Ground Forces
 the Commander of the IRGC Navy
 the Commander of the IRGC Aerospace Force
 the Commander of the IRGC Quds Force
 the Commander of the Basij Organization
 the Commander of the Law Enforcement Force
 the Heads of the Counter Intelligence Units
 the Heads of the Intelligence Units
 approves elected members of the Assembly of Experts.

Iran's regional policy is directly controlled by the office of the Supreme Leader with the Ministry of Foreign Affairs' task limited to protocol and ceremonial occasions. All of Iran's ambassadors to Arab countries, for example, are chosen by the Quds Force, which directly reports to the Supreme Leader.

According to the constitution, all Supreme Leaders (following Ayatollah Khomeini) are to be elected by the Assembly of Experts who are elected by Iranian voters to eight year terms. 
However, all candidates for membership at the Assembly of Experts (along with candidates for President and for the Majlis (parliament)) must have their candidacy approved by the Guardian Council (in 2016 166 candidates were approved by the Guardians out of 801 who applied to run for the office), whose members in turn, are half appointed unilaterally by the Supreme Leader and half subject to confirmation by the Majlis after being appointed by the head of the Iranian judiciary (Chief Justice of Iran), who is himself appointed by the Supreme Leader. Thereby, the Assembly has never questioned the Supreme Leader. There have been cases where incumbent Ali Khamenei publicly criticized members of the Assembly, resulting in their arrest and subsequent removal. There also have been cases where the Guardian Council repealed its ban on particular people after being directed to do so by Khamenei. The Supreme Leader is legally considered "inviolable", with Iranians being routinely punished for questioning or insulting him.

Incorporation in the Constitution

1979
In March 1979, shortly after Ruhollah Khomeini's return from exile and the overthrow of Iran's monarchy, a national referendum was held throughout Iran with the question "Islamic Republic, yes or no?". Although some groups objected to the wording and choice and boycotted the referendum, 98% of those voting voted "yes". Following this landslide victory, the constitution of Iran of 1906 was declared invalid and a new constitution for an Islamic state was created and ratified by referendum during the first week of December in 1979. According to Francis Fukuyama, the 1979 constitution is a "hybrid" of "theocratic and democratic elements" with much of it based on the ideas Khomeini presented in his published book Islamic Government: Governance of the Jurist (Hukumat-e Islami). In the work, Khomeini argued that government must be run in accordance with traditional Islamic sharia, and for this to happen a leading Islamic jurist (faqih) must provide political "guardianship" (wilayat or velayat) over the people. The leading jurist were known as Marja'.

The Constitution stresses the importance of the clergy in government, with Article 4 stating that all civil, criminal, financial, economic, administrative, cultural, military, political, and all other statutes and regulations (must) be keeping with Islamic measures;…the Islamic legal scholars of the watch council (Shura yi Nigahban) will keep watch over this. and the importance of the Supreme Leader. Article 5 states
during the absence of the removed Twelfth Imam (may God hasten his reappearance) government and leadership of the community in the Islamic Republic of Iran belong to the rightful God fearing legal scholar (Faqih) who is recognized and acknowledged as the Islamic leader by the majority of the population.
Article 107 in the constitution mentions Khomeini by name and praises him as the most learned and talented leader for emulation (marja-i taqlid). The responsibilities of the Supreme Leader are vaguely stated in the constitution, thus any 'violation' by the Supreme Leader would be dismissed almost immediately. As the rest of the clergy governed affairs on a daily basis, the Supreme Leader is capable of mandating a new decision as per the concept of Vilayat-e Faqih.

The Supreme Leader does not receive a salary.

1989
Shortly before Khomeini's death a change was made in the constitution allowing a lower ranking Shia cleric to become Supreme Leader. Khomeini had a falling out with his successor Hussein-Ali Montazeri who disapproved of human rights abuses by the Islamic Republic such as the mass execution of political prisoners in late summer and early autumn 1988. Montazeri was demoted as a marja and Khomeini chose a new successor, a relatively low-ranking member of the clergy, Ali Khamene'i. However Article 109 stipulated that the leader be "a source of imitation" (Marja-e taqlid). Khomeini wrote a letter to the president of the Assembly for Revising the Constitution, which was in session at the time, making the necessary arrangements to designate Khamene'i as his successor, and Article 109 was revised accordingly. "Khomeini is supposed to have written a letter to the Chairman of the assembly of Leadership Experts on 29.4.89 in which he emphasised that he had always been of the opinion that the marja'iyat was not a requirement for the office of leader.

Guardianship of the Islamic Jurist (Velayat-e faqih)

The constitution of Iran combines concepts of both democracy and theocracy, theocracy in the form of Khomeini's concept of vilayat-e faqih (Guardianship of the Islamic Jurist), as expressed in the Islamic Republic. According to Ayatollah Khomeini, the Guardianship of the Islamic Jurist was not restricted to orphans or mental incompetents, but applied to everyone in absence of the twelfth Imam. Jurists were the only rightful political/governmental leaders because "God had commanded Islamic government" and "no one knew religion better than the ulama" (Islamic clergy). They alone would preserve "Islamic order" and keep everyone from deviating from "the just path of Islam". Prior to the revolution observant Shia Muslims selected their own leading faqih to emulate (known as a Marja'-i taqlid) according to their own decision making. The "congregation rather than the hierarchy decided how prominent the ayatollah was" thus allowing the public to possibly limit the influence of the Faqih.

After the revolution Shia Muslims (or at least Iranian Shia) were commanded to show allegiance to the current vali-e faghih, Guardian Jurist or Supreme Leader. In this new system, the jurist oversaw all governmental affairs. The complete control exercised by the Faqih was not to be limited to the Iranian Revolution because the revolution and its Leader had international aspirations. As the constitution of the Islamic Republic states, it
intends to establish an ideal and model society on the basis of Islamic norms. ... the Constitution provides the necessary basis for ensuring the continuation of the Revolution at home and abroad. In particular, in the development of international relations, the Constitution will strive with other Islamic and popular movements to prepare the way for the formation of a single world community (in accordance with the Koranic verse `This your community is a single community, and I am your Lord, so worship Me` [21:92]), and to assure the continuation of the struggle for the liberation of all deprived and oppressed peoples in the world.

According to author Seyyed Vali Nasr, Khomeini appealed to the masses, during the pre-1979 period, by referring to them as the oppressed and with charisma and political ability was tremendously successful. He became a very popular role model for Shiites and hoped for the Iranian Revolution to be the first step to a much larger Islamic revolution, transcending Shia Islam, in the same way that Vladimir Lenin and Leon Trotsky wanted their revolution to be a world revolution, not just a Russian one.

Functions, powers, and duties of the Supreme Leader

Duties and Powers given to the Supreme Leader by the Constitution, decrees and other laws are:
 Delineation of the general policies of the Islamic Republic of Iran in consultation with the Nation's Expediency Discernment Council.
 Supervision over the proper execution of the general policies of the systems.
 Resolving conflicts between the three branches of the government
 Issuing decrees for national referendums.
 Supreme command over the Armed Forces.
 Declaration of war and peace, and the mobilization of the armed forces.
 Ability to veto laws passed by the parliament.
 Appointment, dismissal, and acceptance of resignation of:
 the members of Expediency Discernment Council.
 the members of Supreme Council of the Cultural Revolution.
two personal representatives to the Supreme National Security Council.
 Can delegate representatives to all branches of government. Ali Khamenei has currently around 2000 representatives.
 the six fuqaha' of the Guardian Council.
 the supreme judicial authority of the country.
 ministers of defense, intelligence, foreign affairs, and science.
 the head of the radio and television network of the Islamic Republic of Iran.
 the chief of the joint staff.
 the chief commander of the armed forces of the country
 the highest commanders of the armed forces.
 Can dismiss and reinstate ministers.
 Resolving differences between the three wings of the armed forces and regulation of their relations.
 Resolving the problems, which cannot be solved by conventional methods, through the Nation's Expediency Discernment Council.
 Signing the decree formalizing the elections in Iran for the President of the Republic by the people.
 Dismissal of the President of the Republic, with due regard for the interests of the country, after the Supreme Court holds him guilty of the violation of his constitutional duties, or after an impeachment vote of the Islamic Consultative Assembly (Parliament) testifying to his incompetence on the basis of Article 89 of the Constitution.
 Pardoning or reducing the sentences of convicts, within the framework of Islamic criteria, on a recommendation (to that effect) from the head of the Judiciary. The Supreme Leader may delegate part of his duties and powers to another person.
 Confirms decisions of the Supreme National Security Council.
 Control over Special Clerical Court.

List of supreme leaders

The Vice Supreme Leader 
Iranian vice supreme leader role (Deputy Supreme leader) was incorporated into the authority of the supreme leader.

 Ayatollah Hussein-Ali Montazeri (10 November 1985 – 13 March 1989)

During the presidency of Hassan Rouhani, amid longstanding rumors of Khamenei's declining health, it was recommended to Khamenei to reestablish the office of deputy supreme leader to transition towards new leadership better.

Future leader

See also

List of heads of state of Iran
 List of provincial representatives appointed by Supreme Leader of Iran
Execution of Imam Khomeini's Order
Constitution of the Islamic Republic of Iran
Death and state funeral of Ruhollah Khomeini
1989 Iranian Supreme Leader election
List of members in the Fifth Term of the Council of Experts

Notes

References

External links

Official website of the Office of the Supreme Leader
Iranian constitution
WorldStatesmen- Iran
Iran Electoral Archive - Supreme Leader

Supreme Leader
Positions of authority
Religious leadership roles
 
Supreme Leader
Political terminology of Iran
Theocrats
Politics of Iran
1979 establishments in Iran
Ruhollah Khomeini
Ali Khamenei